Palon de la Mare is a mountain of Lombardy, Italy. It has an elevation of 3,703 metres.

Mountains of Lombardy
Ortler Alps
Mountains of the Alps